The 2021 Women's EuroHockey Club Trophy was the 44th edition of the women's Women's EuroHockey Club Trophy, Europe's secondary club field hockey tournament organized by the EHF. It was held from 29 September to 3 October 2021 in Lille, France.

Gantoise won the tournament for the first time, finishing atop the standings at the conclusion of the round robin matches. Sanse Complutense and Braxgata finished in second and third place, respectively.

Teams

 Braxgata
 Gantoise
 East Grinstead
 Lille
 Sanse Complutense

Results

Pool

Fixtures

Awards

References

External links
European Hockey Federation
EHF Results Portal

Club Trophy Women
EuroHockey Club Trophy
International women's field hockey competitions hosted by France
Women's EuroHockey Club Trophy
EuroHockey Club Trophy
EuroHockey Club Trophy
Sport in Lille
EuroHockey Club Trophy